Jacques Rabemananjara (23 June 1913 – 1 April 2005) was a Malagasy politician, playwright and poet. He served as a government minister, rising to Vice President of Madagascar. Rabemananjara was said to be the most prolific writer of his negritude generation after Senghor, and he had the first négritude poetry published.

Early life
Rabemananjara was born in Maroantsetra in Antongil Bay in eastern Madagascar on 23 June 1913 of Betsimisarakan origin. He began his education on the island of Sainte Marie, but soon left to finish his studies at the seminary at Antananarivo, the capital of Madagascar.

In 1935-36 the Madagascan authorities prohibited any further publication of a monthly journal of young people of Madagascar, which he was responsible for. The magazine Revue des Jeunes de Madagascar had 10 issues. The journal was an early example of political writing pre-dating later more well-known examples of négritude.

Writing
Despite his leadership of the journal, Rabemanajara was chosen in 1939 to attend a commemoration in Paris for the 150th anniversary of the French revolution. Having travelled to Paris he was able to not only gain entry to the Sorbonne and took courses in administration, but also to get his first collection of poetry, On the Steps of the Evening, published. In Paris he met the Senagalese poet and politician Léopold Sédar Senghor and Alioune Diop who all participated in the important African studies journal Presence Africaine.

His early work dealt in classical alexandrian metre with the early history of Madagascar. His 1940 work Sur les marches du soir  dealt with the forced exile of Queen Ranavalona III. She had been removed by the French colonial powers in 1897. Rabemananjara published his play Les dieux malgaches, the first modern Malagasy play in French, This play dealt with the pre-colonial past and with the coup that unseated King Radama II in 1863.

Politics
After the war he also met Raset Ravoahangy who was a partner with Rabemananjara in the creation of the MDRM (Democratic Movement for the Renovation of Madagascar).

He was elected to represent the Tamatave region in 1946 as the third member of the National Assembly from Madagascar. As a journalist at this time he interviewed Ho Chi Minh including his association with the Malagasy politician Jean Ralaimongo. He was suspected of being involved in the instigation of the 1947 Malagasy Uprising, despite the fact that he had urged the rioters to be calm. He was arrested, and sentenced to life imprisonment with hard labour.

During his captivity he wrote the poems Antsa, Lamba and Antidote. Rabemanajara was eventually pardoned in 1956. Rabemananjara's freedom allowed him to attend the first International Congress of Black Writers and Artists in Paris. He was one of the main speakers and earned a place at the top table of this important conference which was funded by UNESCO and was still celebrated 50 years later.

He was exiled in France until Madagascar's independence in 1960. The new government under President Philibert Tsiranana asked him to join a number of ministries and take the post of Vice President.

Later years
Rabemanajara was again exiled after the 1972 revolution, but this was his choice and he was not to return for 20 years. He died in France on 1 April 2005.

Major works

Poetry
Sur les marches du soir. Gap: Ophrys, 1940.
Rites millénaires. Paris: Seghers, 1955.
Antsa. Paris: Présence Africaine, 1956.
Lamba. Paris: Présence Africaine, 1956.
Antidote. Paris: Présence Africaine, 1961.
Les ordalies, sonnets d'outre-temps. Paris: Présence Africaine, 1972.
Oeuvres complètes, poésie. Paris: Présence Africaine, 1978.
Thrènes d'avant l'aurore: Madagascar. Paris: Présence Africaine, 1985.
Rien qu'encens et filigrane. Paris: Présence Africaine, 1987.

Essays
Témoignage malgache et nationalisme. Paris: Présence Africaine, 1956.
Nationalisme et problèmes malgaches. Paris: Présence Africaine, 1958.

Plays
Les dieux malgaches. Gap: Ophrys, 1947.
Agape des dieux Tritiva: Une tragédie. Paris: Présence        Africaine, 1962.
Les boutriers de l'aurore. Paris: Présence Africaine, 1957.

Prizes
1988: Grand prix de la francophonie
1997: Salon de la Plume Noire (Paris, 10-12 octobre), consacré au poète Jacques Rabemananjara
Member of "l'Academie Nationale des Arts, des Lettres et des Sciences de Madagascar"

See also

 Ny Avana Ramanantoanina
 Jean-Joseph Rabearivelo
 Dox Razakandrainy
 Elie Rajaonarison
 Aimé Césaire
 Léon Damas
 Harlem Renaissance

References

1913 births
2005 deaths
People from Analanjirofo
Malagasy politicians
Foreign Ministers of Madagascar
Vice presidents of Madagascar
Deputies of the 1st National Assembly of the French Fourth Republic
Malagasy male poets
Malagasy dramatists and playwrights
Malagasy essayists
20th-century Malagasy poets
20th-century dramatists and playwrights
20th-century essayists
Malagasy male writers
20th-century male writers
Malagasy prisoners sentenced to life imprisonment
Prisoners sentenced to life imprisonment by France
Malagasy exiles
French-language writers from Madagascar